The Grand Rapids Jets were a minor league baseball team based in Grand Rapids, Michigan. From 1948 to 1951, the Jets played exclusively as members of the Class A level Central League, winning the 1949 league championship. Hosting home games at Bigelow Field for their duration, the Grand Rapids Jets were a minor league affiliate of the Chicago Cubs in 1950 and 1951.

History
The "Jets" were preceded in minor league baseball by the 1941 Grand Rapids Colts of the Class C level Michigan State League.

In 1948, minor league baseball resumed in Grand Rapids. The Grand Rapids Jets joined the six–team, Class A level Central League, which was reforming following World War II. The Dayton Indians, Flint Arrows, Fort Wayne Generals, Muskegon Clippers, and Saginaw Bears joined the Jets in beginning league play on April 28, 1948. The Jets were the only team in the 1948 league without a major league affiliation.

In their first season of play, the 1948 Jets finished in last place in the Central League regular season, missing the four–team playoffs. Grand Rapids ended the Central League regular season with a record of 52–86, placing sixth in the final standings. Milt Galatzer and Jack Knight served as managers and Knight would manage the team in each of their four seasons of play. Grand Rapids finished 37.0 games behind the first place Flint Arrows in the standings. The Dayton Indians won the playoffs.

The Jets rebounded in 1949 to win the Central League championship. Grand Rapids placed third in the Central League regular season with a record of 70–66, finishing 9.5 games behind the Dayton Indians, as Jack Knight again served as manager. In the first round of the playoffs - Grand Rapids beat the Flint Arrows three games to two and advanced. In the finals, the Jets won the championship by defeating the Charleston Senators four games to two.

The Jets became a minor league affiliate of the Chicago Cubs in 1950 and qualified for the Central League playoffs. The Grand Rapids Jets ended the Central League regular season with a record of 64–68, placing fourth in the standings. Jack Knight returned as manager. The Jets finished 15.5 games behind the first place Flint Arrows, who then defeated Grand Rapids in the first round of the playoffs three games to one.

In their final season as the Jets, Grand Rapids placed fifth in the 1951 Central League standings, as the league held no playoffs in its final season. Continuing as a Chicago Cubs affiliate, Grand Rapids ended the 1951 season with a record of 53–82, as Jack Knight and Everett Robinson served as managers. The Jets finished 33.0 games behind the champion Dayton Indians in the final standings. Jets pitcher Calvin Howe led the Central League with a 2.33 ERA.

The Central League permanently folded following the 1951 season. Grand Rapids was without minor league baseball until 1994, when the city began hosting the West Michigan White Caps of the Class A level Midwest League.

The ballpark
The Grand Rapids Jets hosted home minor league games at Bigelow Field. The ballpark had dimensions (Left, Center, Right) of: 298–530–298 and a seating capacity of 8,000, reduced from 12,000. Bigelow Field was located at 39th Street & South Division Street. Beginning in 1950, the Jets shared Bigelow Field with the Grand Rapids Chicks of the All-American Girls Professional Baseball League. The 1940 Grand Rapids Dodgers and 1941 Grand Rapids Colts and had previously hosted home games at the ballpark.

The ballpark burned down in 1952 and had an official address of 3871 Division Avenue South.

Timeline

Year–by–year records

Notable alumni

Hiram Bithorn (1949)
Hy Cohen (1950)
Marv Felderman (1948)
Milt Galatzer (1948, MGR)
Sammy Gee (1949)
Dave Hoskins (1948–1949)
Cal Howe (1950–1951)
Jack Knight (1948–1951, MGR)
George Piktuzis (1951)
 Dusty Rhodes (1950)
 Andy Varga (1951)

See also
Grand Rapids Jets players

References

External links
Baseball Reference
Bigelow Field photos
Defunct baseball teams in Michigan
Central League teams
Chicago Cubs minor league affiliates
Baseball teams established in 1948
Baseball teams disestablished in 1951
Grand Rapids, Michigan